Phyllonorycter aroniae is a moth of the family Gracillariidae. It is found in Spain.

External links
Fauna Europaea

aroniae
Moths of Europe